The BMW E30 is the second generation of BMW 3 Series, which was produced from 1982 to 1994 and replaced the E21 3 Series. The model range included 2-door coupe and convertible body styles, as well as being the first 3 Series to be produced in 4-door sedan and wagon/estate body styles. It was powered by four-cylinder petrol, six-cylinder petrol and six-cylinder diesel engines, the latter a first for the 3 Series. The E30 325iX model was the first BMW to have all-wheel drive.

The BMW Z1 roadster was also based on the E30 platform. Following the launch of the E36 3 Series in 1990, the E30 began to be phased out.

Development 

Development of the E30 3 Series began in July 1976, with styling being developed under chief designer Claus Luthe with exterior styling led by Boyke Boyer. In 1978, the final design was approved, with design freeze (cubing process) being completed in 1979. BMW's launch film for the E30 shows the design process including Computer-aided design (CAD), crash testing and wind-tunnel testing. The car was released at the end of November 1982.

Externally, the E30's appearance is very similar to twin headlight versions of its E21 predecessor, however there are various detail changes in styling to the E30. Major differences to the E21 include the interior and a revised suspension, the latter to reduce the oversteer for which the E21 was criticised.

Minor update (1985)

In 1985 the exterior and interior trim were updated. The 323i model was replaced with the 325i at this time and the diesel-engined 324d was introduced. A factory convertible entered the model range. However, the Baur remained on sale, alongside the factory convertible. The M3 convertible was only offered for the European market.

Major update (1987)

At the Frankfurt Motor Show in September 1987, BMW introduced a major update to the E30 (often called Series 2). The changes to the lineup were the addition of the Touring (station wagon) variant and removal of the 325e model. The 1987 update models remained largely unchanged until the end of production, with the addition of the 318is model in 1989.

External styling changes included redesigned rear lights, front bumper and a reduction in the amount of chrome trim. The four-cylinder engine was upgraded from the BMW M10 to the BMW M40 and various other mechanical changes were made. Rust protection was improved with the update.

Body styles 
In addition to the two-door sedan and Baur convertible body styles of its E21 predecessors, the E30 later also became available as a four-door sedan and five-door station wagon (marketed as "Touring").

The Touring body style began life as a prototype built by BMW engineer Max Reisböck in his friend's garage in 1984 and began production in 1987. The factory convertible version began production in 1985, with the Baur convertible conversions remaining available alongside it.

Engines 
Initially, the E30 used carryover four-cylinder (M10) and six-cylinder (M20) petrol engines from its E21 predecessor. Over the production run, new families of four-cylinder petrol engines were introduced and the six-cylinder engine received various upgrades. A six-cylinder diesel engine was introduced, in both naturally aspirated and turbocharged forms.

Factory specifications are shown below.

Four-cylinder petrol 

At the launch of the E30 range in 1982, the 316 used a 1766 cc version of the M10 fed by a carburetor and producing .  The 318i had the same M10 engine, but with Bosch L-Jetronic fuel-injection, increasing power to  while also improving fuel economy.

The 1987 Series 2 update introduced a new four-cylinder engine: the M40, which used Bosch Motronic fuel-injection. In the 318i, a  version of the M40 was used. The 316i model replaced the 316, using a  version of the M40.

The 318iS was released in 1989, using the new M42 engine and only being available with two doors. This is the most modern engine available in the E30 range, incorporating DOHC, the updated Bosch Motronic 1.7, hydraulic valve adjusters and coil-on-plug ignition. In some markets, the M42 engine was used in the 318i/318iC models, instead of the M40.

The M3 is powered by the S14 engine, a high-revving four-cylinder engine.

Six-cylinder petrol 

At the launch of the E30 range, the six-cylinder models consisted of the 320i, which had a  version of the M20 producing , and the 323i, with a  M20 producing , both using Bosch L-Jetronic fuel injection. These models were not sold in North America, presumably for emissions reasons. In 1985, the 2.3 L engine was replaced with a 2.5 L version of the M20, which produced  and used Bosch Motronic fuel injection. This engine was available in the 325i variants, including the all-wheel drive 325iX.

An economy version called the 325e was released with a lower revving, more fuel efficient engine. The e is an abbreviation for eta, which is used to represent the thermal efficiency of a heat engine. To maximise low-rev torque, the 325e engine was the largest available in an E30 (aside from the 333i model, which was only sold in South Africa). The 325e engine had a longer stroke than the 325i version, with a more restrictive head, four cam bearings instead of seven, and single valve springs (instead of the dual valve springs used by the 325i version).

Six-cylinder diesel 

In 1983 the M21 engine was unveiled in the new 524td at the IAA, Germany. The M21 engine used a Garrett turbocharger (without an intercooler).

In 1985 BMW introduced the 324d, a naturally aspirated version of the same M21 engine, which was popular in countries with a high motor vehicle tax.

The updated engine has a smaller turbocharger, decreasing turbo lag.

Drivetrain

In total, six transmissions were available for the various models of the E30: four manuals, and two automatics. The E30 was offered with rear-wheel drive, or permanent all-wheel drive (325iX saloons and estates only).

Manual transmissions
 4-speed Getrag 242 — 316 and 318i models
 5-speed Getrag 240 — 316, 318i and 320i models (with a different bellhousing for the 320i, to suit the BMW M20 engine, and another different bellhousing to suit the later M42-engined 318i/is).
 5-speed Getrag 260 — 323i, 325e, 325es and 325i models.
 5-speed Getrag 265 — M3 model (dog-leg shift pattern for European models and a standard H-pattern for North American models).

Automatic transmissions
 3-speed ZF 3HP22 — 1981 to 1985.
 4-speed ZF 4HP22 — 320i and 323i models until 1985, available on all models from 1985 onwards.

Suspension
One of the features that added to the roominess of the E30 was the suspension. The front MacPherson struts and rear semi-trailing arm suspension were a compact arrangement that left a lot of cabin and boot space for the car's overall size. The semi-trailing arms have been criticized for the dynamic toe and camber changes inherent to the suspension geometry, causing bump steer in hard cornering situations (such as racing and autocross). Nonetheless, reviewers praised the handling of the E30.

A widened version of the E30 front suspension and the drivetrain from the E30 325i were used in the BMW Z1 roadster. The BMW Z3 and BMW Compact (E36/5) rear suspensions are also very similar to the E30, but utilizing five-lug hubs. The Z3-based BMW M Coupé uses a widened version of the same rear semi-trailing arm suspension along with stronger hubs.

Brakes 
For the front wheels, all models use disc brakes. Early 316/318 models have solid discs, while all subsequent models have vented discs. For the rear wheels, most models use solid disc brakes, except for some early models: 4cylinder & 6cylinder models which use drum brakes. Anti-lock braking system (ABS) became available in 1986.

Model range

United States & Canada 

The model range in the United States consisted of the following:
 318i (1984-1985 using the M10 engine, then 1991 using the M42 engine)
 318is (1991 only)
 325, 325e and 325es
 325i, 325is (1987-1991 only)
 325ix (1988-1991 only)

The primary distinctive feature of the BMW E30 models produced for the North American market in 1984–1987 is the protruding front and rear aluminum bumpers. These bumpers are commonly known as "diving boards." In 1987, the anodized aluminum bumpers for the North American market were shortened by revising the cover/fillers and shortening the shock absorbers on which they were mounted. In mid-1988 (for model year 1989), shorter body-coloured plastic bumpers replaced the aluminium ones altogether.

South Africa 
In South Africa, only the  two-door and four-door sedans were built, four cylinder gasoline (petrol) models production continued there until 1992.

Despite the introduction of the M40 engine, the old M10-powered 316 continued to be sold in South Africa until 1991, gaining the new bumpers when the range was updated.

The 333i is a South Africa-only model, and the South African 325iS models were a different specification from 325iS models sold in other countries.

M3 model 

The BMW M3 utilised a widened and heavily redesigned variation of the two-door body style, therefore the M3 shares few body parts with other E30 models. The M3 suspension is also significantly different from regular E30 models, including five-lug wheel bolts.

Alpina models 

The Alpina C1, C2, B3 and B6 models were based on the E30.

Special models

320is

For Portugal and Italy only, due to considerably higher taxes for cars with engines exceeding 2000 cc, a special model was created: the 320is. The four-door version appeared in the dealers' showrooms in September 1987 while the two-door followed in March 1988. Production of the 320is continued until 1991.

The 320is shared the same dogleg Getrag 265 gearbox of the non-US M3 while it had a limited slip differential with the same 25% lock up rate but with a shorter differential ratio of 3.46:1. All the 320is models were left hand drive and without a catalytic converter. Sports suspension was fitted to all two-door models, and to four-doors produced from September 1989.

The interior of the 320is was identical to that of other 3 Series models, except an M3 instrument cluster (which features an oil temperature gauge instead of a fuel economy gauge) was used. The 320is was sold for three years, with 1,206 four-doors and 2,542 two-doors produced.

M325i

In New Zealand, where the M3 was never sold by BMW, the local importer created a sporting version of the sedan called M325i. About 100 such cars were imported beginning in late 1986 until at least 1990. Fitted with the standard non-catalyzed  2.5 litre engine they benefited from a Motorsport tuned suspension, the M-Technic body package, 15-inch BBS cross-spoke wheels with wide, low profile (225/50) tyres, and a limited-slip differential. The M325i is quite similar to the British market 325i Sport, also developed as a response to the absence of a right-hand-drive M3.

333i
BMW South Africa's Motorsport division created the 333i in 1985 by fitting the 3.2 L M30 "big six" engine to a two-door E30. The resulting 333i was a success in South African saloon car racing. These cars were built with help from Alpina in Buchloe, Germany. Due to the space constraints caused by the large M30 engine, the buyer was forced to choose between air conditioning (highly desirable in South Africa) and power steering. Cars with power steering are distinguished by having foglights, cars with air-conditioning instead had ducts providing fresh air for the air-conditioning. The 333i was produced from 1985 to 1987 and only 204 cars were produced.

South African 325iS 
The 325iS (Gusheshe) was created by BMW South Africa to replace the 2.5 litre 126 kW 325i in Group N production car racing, as a response to the introduction of the Opel Kadett 2 litre 16V to the Class A category. Early 325iS cars had a 2.5 litre motor, and various weight lightning interventions including alloy doors and drilled out sections in boot hinges and other steel pressings. The 2.7 litre 325iS, commonly called Evo 2, replaced the 'Evo 1' cars, Evo 2 cars had standard doors. It was launched in the first half of 1990 and was powered by an Alpina-fettled, 2.7 litre M20 engine which produced . Following the introduction of the upgraded Opel Kadett 16V SuperBoss, in 1991 BMW South Africa introduced the 325iS Evolution HP, commonly referred to as the Evo 2. The motor was upgraded to produce .

The Evolution HP won the Group N Class A title in 1993, winning 20 of the 24 races in the process. The Robbi Smith and Geoff Goddard Evolution HP won the season-ending 9hr race.

323i JPS 
The John Player Special Edition is an Australian-only limited edition special offered by BMW Australia as a tribute to the M3 race cars competing in local touring car racing. JPS refers to the BMW race team sponsor, John Player Special cigarettes. The cars are based on a 323i manual "coupés", painted in black with gold pinstripes and gold BBS wheels. They also had Recaro sports seats, JPS badging, a limited slip differential, sports suspension, a sunroof (optional) and a body kit. The cars were ordered from the factory as a base 323i in black with a fixed selection of options - all of which were otherwise available to order but priced at a substantial discount as an Edition package. The pinstripes were added in Australia and the wheels were also gold anodised in Australia. The production run was 70 cars.

Production 
The E30 was produced in Munich, Germany; Regensburg, Germany; and Rosslyn, South Africa. Series production began in October 1982.

Models sold in Indonesia and Thailand used complete knock-down kits produced in Germany, which were assembled in Jakarta and Bangkok respectively.

Production of the E30 began to wind down in 1990, due to the introduction of the E36 3 Series coupé models. Sedan production concluded on April 30, 1991, at Regensburg. Other variants were phased out gradually, until the final E30 model, a Touring, was produced in 1994, and sold as a 1995 model year.

Motorsport 

The E30 M3 had a very successful career in Touring car racing.

The E30 remains a popular car for racing and E30-specific racing series such as the National Auto Sport Association's Spec E30 class are run in the United States, Australia and New Zealand.

Television feature appearances 
 Wheeler Dealers Season 2 Episode 7 includes a 325i Touring.
 In the Top Gear television series Season 16 Episode 4, the presenters entered a challenge for 4-seat convertibles costing under £2000. All 3 presenters purchased E30 325i convertibles.

References

Further reading

 
 
 
 
 
 

3 Series
E30
Cars introduced in 1982
1990s cars
Cars discontinued in 1994

sv:BMW 3-serie#E30